G-Force is an action platform video game based on the film of the same name. It was released in July 2009 for Microsoft Windows, Nintendo DS, PlayStation 2, PlayStation 3, PlayStation Portable, Wii, Xbox 360 and iOS.

Plot
The plot is based on the movie, in which a group of highly trained guinea pigs (Darwin, Blaster, and Juarez) fight against Leonard Saber, an evil billionaire and his robotic "household appliances" army.

The game plot differs from the movie in several key ways. In the film, Speckles is missing after the others escape the pet store until the final scenes of the movie. In the video game, Speckles reappears a short time later claiming that he escaped the trash compactor. The game also interjects several new locations including the appliance production centre and some sewers not seen in the movie, and Saber's partner "Yanshu" talks to Darwin several times throughout the third and fourth acts. In addition, the game also ends differently, Darwin finds Speckles in a giant satellite dish rather than at an appliance store, and the latter does not have a change of heart and does not stop his evil plan. Instead, he continues and Mooch must destroy the machine, presumably killing Speckles. However, in the final moments of the game, Speckles' hand emerges from the wreckage, implying he survived. Additionally, Ben orders G-Force to vacate the area when the FBI closes in, instead of them being promoted by the FBI.

Gameplay 
G-Force is an action-adventure game played from a third person perspective. The player plays through multiple linear levels in a variety of environments in order to progress. In combat, the player controls Darwin and must use his arsenal to defeat his enemies. Some of the weapons in Darwin's arsenal include his electric whip, a plasma gun, and a freeze gun.

Outside of combat, the player must complete platforming challenges using Darwin's jetpack which allows him to hover in the air. They must also solve puzzles, some of which require the player to control Mooch, a gnat who can fly and enter places Darwin can't. Mooch can disable enemies and traps, which allows Darwin to progress. In certain sections, the player controls a modified hamster ball and must travel through sewers, shooting enemies and avoiding obstacles.

Throughout the game, the player can collect SaberSense Chips, an in-game currency that allows the player to purchase upgrades for their weapons.

The most notable difference among the various platforms on which the games were released is that the PlayStation 3 and Xbox 360 versions featured an anaglyph-based stereoscopic 3-D mode, and were packaged with two sets of 3-D glasses. Reviewers at GamesMaster claimed that they would be content should this 3D mode pave the way for the "future of games", but the addition does not seem to have caught on to the mainstream videogame industry, as of the 2020s. A gradual increase in VR and more immersive gaming has occurred in the years following the release of G-Force, but is unlikely that there is much relation or causation.

Reception

The game received "mixed or average reviews" on all platforms except the iOS version, according to the review aggregation website Metacritic.

GameSpot said of the PlayStation 3, Wii, and Xbox 360 versions: "Fun combat and crafty puzzles make this a good companion to the blockbuster movie". Greg Miller of IGN said "G-Force isn't a game everyone should be lining up to play, but people looking to have an interactive piece of the movie shouldn't be disappointed". IT Reviews wrote: "The flaws are easy to spot; G-Force is decent, solid, chipper family entertainment". Game Revolution was more negative, giving it a "C" grade and criticized the "repetitive puzzle design [and] bland visuals".

The 3D mode received mixed reviews. GamesMaster said of the Xbox 360 version: "Don't underestimate the wow factor of the 3D mode - if this is the future of games, sign us up". IT Reviews, on the other hand, said of the same console version: "The 3D glasses bundled in are a gimmick at best, a one-way trip to a headache at worst".

References

External links

G-Force video game page

2009 video games
IOS games
Nintendo DS games
PlayStation 2 games
PlayStation 3 games
PlayStation Network games
PlayStation Portable games
Video games based on films
Video games developed in the United Kingdom
Video games with stereoscopic 3D graphics
Wii games
Windows games
Xbox 360 games
Eurocom games
Action video games
Multiplayer and single-player video games
3D platform games
Video games scored by Steve Duckworth